Enter Madame is an American romantic comedy film directed by Elliott Nugent, starring Elissa Landi and Cary Grant, and released by Paramount Pictures.

The film is based on a three-act play of the same name that ran from August 16, 1920 to April 1922 at the Garrick Theatre in New York City for a total of 350 performances. The stage version was directed by Brock Pemberton. The 1935 movie was a remake of a 1922 silent film starring Clara Kimball Young and Louise Dresser.

Cast
Elissa Landi as Lisa Della Robbia
Cary Grant	as Gerald Fitzgerald
Lynne Overman as Mr. Farnum
Sharon Lynn as Flora Preston
Michelette Burani as Bice
Paul Porcasi as Archimede
Adrian Rosley as Doctor
Cecilia Parker as Aline Chalmers
Frank Albertson as John Fitzgerald
Wilfred Hari as Tamamoto
Torben Meyer as Carlson
Harold Berquist as Bjorgenson
Diana Lewis as Operator
Richard Bonelli as Scarpia in 'La Tosca'
Ann Sheridan as Flora's Shipboard Friend (as Clara Lou Sheridan)

Production credits
 Elliott Nugent - director
 Benjamin Glazer - producer
 Gladys Lehman - screenplay
 Charles Brackett - screenplay
 Nathaniel Finston - musical direction
 Travis Banton - costume design
 Theodor Sparkuhl - photography
 William C. Mellor - photography
 Ernst Fegté - art director

References

External links
 

1935 films
1935 romantic comedy films
American black-and-white films
Paramount Pictures films
Films directed by Elliott Nugent
American films based on plays
American romantic comedy films
Films with screenplays by Charles Brackett
1930s English-language films
1930s American films